Arlington-Five Forks-Kenwood was a census-designated place (then termed an unincorporated place) in Prince George County, Virginia, United States. Its first and only designation was at the 1950 United States Census when it had a population of 4,124. Arlington-Five Forks-Kenwood did not reappear at subsequent censuses.

References

Unincorporated communities in Prince George County, Virginia
Former census-designated places in Virginia
Unincorporated communities in Virginia